Stormy Weather is a 2003 French-Icelandic drama film directed by Sólveig Anspach and starring Élodie Bouchez. It was screened in the Un Certain Regard section at the 2003 Cannes Film Festival.

Cast
 Élodie Bouchez - Cora
 Didda Jónsdóttir - Loa
 Baltasar Kormákur - Einar
 Ingvar Eggert Sigurðsson - Gunnar (as Ingvar E. Sigurðsson)
 Christophe Sermet - Romain
 Natan Cogan - Grandfather
 Christian Crahay - Le médecin-chef
 Tinna Gudmundsdóttir - Tinna
 Davíð Örn Halldórsson - David
 Ólafía Hrönn Jónsdóttir - Gudrun
 Marina Tomé - Mademoiselle Ramirez

References

External links

2003 films
2003 drama films
French drama films
2000s French-language films
2000s English-language films
English-language Icelandic films
English-language French films
Films directed by Sólveig Anspach
Icelandic drama films
2003 multilingual films
French multilingual films
Icelandic multilingual films
2000s French films